Ghalemdi Khola Hydropower Station (Nepali:घलेम्दी खोला जलविद्युत आयोजना) is a run-of-river hydro-electric plant located in   Myagdi District of Nepal. The flow from Ghalemdi River is used to generate 5 MW electricity. The plant is owned and developed by Ghalemdi Hydro Limited, an IPP of Nepal. 

The plant started generating electricity in 2020 and the generation licence will expire in 2049, after which the plant will be handed over to the government.  The power station is connected to the national grid and the electricity is sold to Nepal Electricity Authority.

The project cost is NPR 1.15 billion.  An IPO was issued in 2075 B.S.

See also

List of power stations in Nepal

References

Hydroelectric power stations in Nepal
Gravity dams
Run-of-the-river power stations
Dams in Nepal
Irrigation in Nepal
2020 establishments in Nepal
Buildings and structures in Myagdi District